Mutah Wassin Shabazz Beale (born October 7, 1977), better known as Napoleon, is an American former rapper of Tupac's rap group Outlawz. He has since converted to Islam and is now a motivational speaker.

Early life 
Beale grew up in Newark, New Jersey. He was raised by his Christian grandmother after his Muslim parents were murdered in their home in front of him in "an 'execution-style' slaying" when he was three.

Career 
Napoleon was a member of the Outlawz (originally "Dramacydal", subsequently "tha Outlaw Immortalz"), a hip hop group founded by rapper Tupac Shakur in late 1995 after Shakur's release from prison.  Collectively, they were best known for their association with Shakur, coming to prominence by appearing on his Makaveli album. After Shakur's death in 1996, the group were co-billed on the posthumous album Still I Rise, and released their first album, Ride wit Us or Collide wit Us in 2000. Napoleon also appeared on their next two albums, Novakane (2001) and Neva Surrenda (2002). In 2006, Napoleon released his only solo album Loyalty Over Money.

Conversion to Islam 
In 2001, a Muslim record producer, impressed by Napoleon's potential as a leader, motivated him to embrace Islam and forsake his former use of alcohol and drugs. Beale considers hip hop and Islam to be incompatible, because "they basically call for two different things" and that even if the song's message is positive, "if it is not according to the Sunnah (teachings) of the Prophet Muhammad, then it is unacceptable".

Personal life 
He married a Emirati woman with whom he has four children. As of 2003, he and his brother owned a barbershop in Studio City, Los Angeles. In 2014, he became co-owner of a coffee shop in Riyadh.

Discography

Studio albums 
With Outlawz
Still I Rise (1999)
Ride Wit Us or Collide Wit Us (2000)
Novakane (2001)
Neva Surrenda (2002)

List of 2Pac albums below that Mutah "Napoleon" Beale appeared on

Me Against The World – "Outlaw"
All Eyez On Me – "Tradin' War Stories", "When We Ride", "Thug Passion", "Run Tha Streetz"
The Don Killuminati: The 7 Day Theory – "Life of an Outlaw"
R U Still Down? (Remember Me) – "Enemies With Me"
Until The End Of Time – "Breathin'", "All Out", "World Wide Mob Figgaz", "U Don't Have 2 Worry", "LastOnesLeft"
Better Dayz – "Fuck 'Em All", "Fame", "Catchin' Feelins", "This Life I Lead", "They Don't Give A Fuck About Us"

Soundtracks
Supercop – "Made Niggaz"
Gang Related – "Made Niggaz", "What's Ya Fantasy?"

Filmography 
 Thug Life (2001)
 Outlawz: Worldwide (DVD) (2002)
 Tupac: Assassination (2007)

References

External links 
 
 
 MW Cafe website

1977 births
Living people
African-American male rappers
Converts to Islam
Death Row Records artists
Gangsta rappers
Outlawz members
African-American Muslims
American people of Puerto Rican descent
American expatriates in Saudi Arabia
American Muslim activists
21st-century American rappers
21st-century American male musicians
American motivational speakers